Nafi may refer to:

Nafi language

People
Basheer Nafi
Abu Suhail an-Nafi
Uqba ibn Nafi
Ibn al-Nafis
Nafi Tuitavake
Nafi Mersal
Nafi Mawla Ibn Umar
Nafi Toure
Nafi' bin Hilal al-Jamali
Nafi‘ al-Madani
Nafi ibn al-Harith
Nafi Thiam
Nafi Kabakoğlu
Sharfin Al Nafi

See also
NAFI (disambiguation)